Jeff Tracy is a fictional character from Gerry and Sylvia Anderson's Supermarionation television show Thunderbirds and the subsequent films Thunderbirds Are GO and Thunderbird 6. The voice for the character in these shows was supplied by Peter Dyneley. The character also appeared in the live-action movie Thunderbirds, played by actor Bill Paxton.

Original series biography
The series was first broadcast in 1965 and was set in the then future, in 2026 or 2065, when Jeff was (or will be) 56. According to his backstory "bio", Jeff was born 2 January, the son of a combine harvester driver on a Kansas wheat farm.

 Military service in the U.S. Air Force achieving rank of colonel
 Transfer to Space Agency to become an early lunar astronaut
 Jeff married and became the father of five sons (from eldest to youngest): Scott; Virgil; John; Gordon; and Alan. Each of the Tracy boys (born in rapid succession in the period 2000-2005 or 2039-2044) was named after one of the Project Mercury astronauts: Scott Carpenter, Virgil Grissom, John Glenn, Gordon Cooper and Alan Shepard.
 His wife died possibly in a  non-canonical 1993 comic strip, in which she and Jeff's father, Grant Tracy, died in an avalanche, while a novel published in 2008 had her pass away as a result of a road accident, where her vehicle fell off the side of a cliff.
 Jeff raised his five sons, while building up a civil engineering, construction and aerospace business that made him one of the richest men in the world.
 He became a philanthropist and instigated and financed International Rescue.

As the Tracy family patriarch, he spends most of his time on Tracy Island, situated somewhere in the Pacific Ocean, from where he co-ordinates rescue missions.

It has been suggested that the Tracy family are based on the Cartwrights from the TV series Bonanza, and that the Jeff Tracy puppet is based on the actor who played Ben Cartwright, Lorne Greene.

Along with his sons, Scott and Virgil, Jeff is the only other Tracy to appear in all 32 episodes of Thunderbirds.

2004 film
In an interview, Bill Paxton, who played the live-action version of Jeff, described the character as "a kind of teacher, this father figure who has to teach his sons, particularly his youngest son Alan, these basic lessons of ethics and integrity, about doing the right thing."

Remake series
In the 2015 'reboot' of the series, Jeff vanished six years previous to the start of the series for which the Hood is shown to be responsible. Scott appears to have assumed control of International Rescue in his father's place as he is the oldest of the Tracy brothers, while Grandma Tracy, who has herself changed from the classic series, has taken over his role as head of the family.

The origins for International Rescue are also explained gradually throughout the series. Jeff originally was the only member with one ship: the TV-21, an ultra-high speed rocket and a vehicle by Brains' own admission that was faster than any Thunderbird, with his ultimate objective to be the first one to the rescue. However when he lost the TV-21, he instead created the 5 Thunderbirds to be there for any emergency.

Jeff finally appears in season 3, initially in recordings in the two-part episode "Signals", which reveals that he was last seen trying to stop the Hood stealing the Zero-X spaceship; when the Hood's actions nearly caused the Zero-X's engine to overload and cause an extinction-level event, Jeff took the ship into space, with the apparent detonation believed to be the ship's engine overloading and exploding. However at the end of "SOS", Brains discovered that rescued robot Braman was not sending a distress call, but was actually acting as a relay to send the message to Earth, and discovers a coded message within the distress call that could only have come from Jeff. After recovering the escape pod that the Hood made his escape in, Brains realizes that the explosion was a shockwave created as a result of the ship's faster-than-light engine working, which propelled Jeff into deep space. At the end of the episode "The Long Reach - Part One", Scott, while trying to make his way back to Thunderbird 1, almost falls into the reaches of space after two asteroids collide with each other. Scott is caught by a mysterious figure's hand; he looks up and realizes that it is his father, Jeff Tracy. In the episode "The Long Reach - Part Two", Jeff reunites with his sons after Scott brings him home. After defeating The Hood, Jeff reunites with the rest of the team on Tracy Island. Lee Majors provided the voice of Jeff in the revival series.

Notes

References

External links 
 Thunderbirds Characters

American male characters in television
Fictional astronauts
Fictional business executives
Fictional characters from Kansas
Fictional colonels
Fictional United States Air Force personnel
Male characters in animated series
Male characters in film
Television characters introduced in 1965
Thunderbirds (TV series) characters
Fictional people from the 21st-century